Lake Mokoan was an artificial lake in northern Victoria, Australia, roughly 7 km north-east of Benalla. It was created by diverting water from the Broken River and Hollands Creek into Winton and Green swamps. Construction began in the late 1960s and was completed in 1971.

Hundreds of thousands of trees within the swamp soon died across the lake and surrounding plains, killed by the flooding of the former swampland. The large, shallow lake had a very high surface area to volume ratio, resulting in extreme water loss through evaporation, and there were frequent toxic algal blooms requiring regular closures for recreation activities and causing livestock to become ill. 

Although a locally popular watersports destination, the Victorian government decided to decommission the canals and lake to restore the landscape to a more natural wetland and woodland ecosystem. The restoration effort is expected to take at least 100 years. Planning for the decommissioning began in 2004 and work started in 2009. Decommissioning the lake was expected to allow the rebalancing of 44 gigalitres of water per year to the Broken, Goulburn, Snowy and Murray rivers and irrigation network, with environmental and economic benefits to both upstream and downstream areas. Instead of evaporating away at Lake Mokoan, the saved water would be redirected or pumped overland from the upstream Lake Nillahcootie and Lake Eildon, 25 gigalitres of the lake would be released into the Murray River system, and another 20 gigalitres into the Snowy River.

In 2010 Lake Mokoan site was reformed into the Winton Wetlands Reserve, and managed by a Local Committee of Management. The Committee is tasked with construction of infrastructure, developing tourism and the restoration the landscape. To date, the renewal has resulted in a Visitor Centre and cafe, interpretive information signs, four campgrounds, picnic areas, public toilet blocks, 60 km of roads, bush walks, 30 km of cycling trails, and artworks celebrating the landscape and its history, have been provided. Camping at official campgrounds is available and boating, fishing is permitted. Environmental restoration is progressing, averaging 200 hectares per year, and plants regenerating and wildlife populations are increasing on the site.

References

Lakes of Victoria (Australia)
Goulburn Broken catchment
Rivers of Hume (region)